WKDZ-FM (106.5 MHz) is a radio station licensed in Cadiz, Kentucky.  WKDZ-FM is owned by Ham Broadcasting.  Beth Mann serves as Ham Broadcasting owner/president.

In 2004, Ham Broadcasting moved from their former Will Jackson Road location to a new  facility at Broadbent Square in east Cadiz.

History 
The station first signed on the air at 106.3 megahertz on May 18, 1972. It began as a 3,000-watt FM simulcast station of WKDZ-AM for its first 24 years on the air. At that time, WKDZ-AM broadcast a Variety format. 

In 1986, the station became separate from the AM counterpart, and began broadcasting an Adult contemporary format under the WBZD callsign. Sometime later in that decade, it changed to an easy listening format. In 1991, when current owner Ham Broadcasting purchased the station, its callsign was reverted to the original WKDZ-FM it held as a repeater of the AM station, and it began broadcasting a country format, which remains with the station today.

Programming

Format and coverage area
WKDZ-FM broadcasts a country music format and serves Trigg, Christian, Caldwell, Lyon, and Todd counties in Kentucky, along with nearby Montgomery and Stewart counties in Middle Tennessee.

Sports programming
In addition to its usual music programming, WKDZ-FM is an affiliate of the Tennessee Titans Radio Network, which broadcasts live games involving the NFL's Tennessee Titans based in Nashville. WKDZ-FM also serves as one of three affiliates of the University of Kentucky Wildcats radio network in the Clarksville-Hopkinsville market (the other two are WHOP-AM and WHOP-FM). WKDZ-FM also broadcasts Trigg County High School football games on Friday nights from mid-August through November.

On August 1, 2017, the station launched YourSportsEdge.com, a sports website dedicated to covering sports at Trigg County High School, Caldwell County High School, Lyon County High School, Hopkinsville High School, Christian County High School, Heritage Christian Academy, University Heights Academy, Fort Campbell High School, and Todd County Central High School.  In addition, the site covers college sports and the Hoptown Hoppers Ohio Valley League baseball team.

News operation
WKDZ-FM is unique in that it, along with sister stations WHVO and WKDZ-AM, boasts a full-time news department in house. The one-hour newscasts, branded as News Edge, are broadcast at 12 Noon and 5:00 p.m. Central Time over all three Ham Broadcasting-owned stations. Shorter newscasts are run at 6, 7, and 8 a.m. CT. Hourly national news updates are provided by Fox News Radio at the top of each hour.

Awards and recognitions
WKDZ-FM has been recognized many times for its community service. The station also has won a Marconi Award for "Small Market Station Of The Year" in 2008, 2013, and 2017. WKDZ-FM has also been consistently nominated for the coveted NAB Crystal Award for Community Service, which they won in 2013.

On-air staff

Weekdays
Alan Watts (mornings 5 - 9 am)
Cindy Allen Lax (mornings 7:30 - 9 am)
 Eddie Owen (midday 9 am - 12 pm)
Bill Booth 'Live Afternoon Drive'  (1 - 5 pm)
Greg Leath (evenings 6 pm - 12 am) 
Scott Brown (news - Noon News Edge Host and sports)
Ann Petrie (news - 5 pm News Edge Host)
Tammy Hancock (news)

Weekends
 Scott Brown 'Your Sports Edge Saturday' (Saturday 8:15 - 9 am)
Bill Booth (Saturday 6 - 8 am & 9 am - 1 pm & Sunday from 10 am to 3 pm)
Eddie Owen (Saturday 1 - 6 pm)
Greg Leath (Saturday 6 pm - 12 am)
Rich Miller 'Power County'  (Sunday 6 - 8 am)
John Ritter 'Rise Up' (Sunday 8 am - 10 am)
Rick Jackson's Country Classics (Sunday 7 - 10 pm)
Steve Stewart 'The Road' (Sunday 10 pm - 12 am)

References

External links
WKDZ-FM official website
WKDZ News E-dge
WKDZ Sports E-dge

KDZ-FM
Radio stations established in 1972
Country radio stations in the United States
Cadiz, Kentucky